Andrew (Andy) Robert Mooney (born March 24, 1965) is a Canadian politician, who was a member of the Legislative Assembly of Prince Edward Island from 1996 to 2007. He represented the electoral district of Souris-Elmira and was a member of the Progressive Conservative Party.

The son of Arthur Mooney, he was employed with Arthur Mooney and Sons Farm and with the Canadian Forces. Mooney served as deputy speaker in the provincial assembly.

References 
 O'Handley, K Canadian Parliamentary Guide, 2000 

Living people
1965 births
People from Kings County, Prince Edward Island
Progressive Conservative Party of Prince Edward Island MLAs
21st-century Canadian politicians